The 1976–77 Romanian Hockey League season was the 47th season of the Romanian Hockey League. Ten teams participated in the league, and Steaua Bucuresti won the championship.

Final round

5th-10th place

External links
hochei.net

Romania
Romanian Hockey League seasons
Rom